Mizue Takada (高田 みづえ Takada Mizue, born June 23, 1960) is a Japanese female singer and idol.

Biography

She debuted on March 25, 1977 with the single Garasu Zaka (The Slopes Of Glass) which became an Oricon top 10 hit. Between 1977 and 1985 she released 26 singles. All of these charted on the Oricon top 100 chart list and 17 reached the top 40. Her music was an unusual blend between Kayōkyoku and Enka.

At the 1977 Japan Record Awards, the FNS Music Festival, the Tokyo Music Festival, the Nippon Television Music Festival, the Ginza Music Festival, the Shinjuku Music Festival and at the Japan Cable Awards, Takada all won the Best Newcomer award.

Takada was promoted alongside Idols Ikue Sakakibara and Yukiko Shimizu, who also debuted in 1977. They were dubbed the "Fresh San'nin Musume" (three fresh girls). Before them Junko Sakurada, Momoe Yamaguchi and Masako Mori were promoted in the same fashion.

She performed for a total of 7 times at the Kōhaku Uta Gassen festival between 1977 and 1984.

Mizue Takada retired from show business in 1985 after marriage to Wakashimazu Mutsuo, and is the okamisan at Nishonoseki stable.

On August 8, 2015 she sang at the NHK "Omoide no Melody" music show, her first public performance in 30 years.

Top 40 singles

See also 

 Kayōkyoku
 Enka
 Japanese idol
 List of Japanese idols

References

1960 births
Living people
Japanese women singers
Japanese idols